Lakhauri is a village development committee in Dhanusa District in the Janakpur Zone of south-eastern Nepal. At the time of the 1991 Nepal census, it had 2,882 people living in 505 households.

References

External links
UN map of the municipalities of Dhanusa District

Populated places in Dhanusha District